Turija is a village in the municipality of Bujanovac, Serbia. According to the 2020 census, the town has a population of 400 people. Of these, 395 (98,75 %) were ethnic Albanians, 4 (1,0 %) were Serbs, and 1 (0,25 %) other.

References

Populated places in Pčinja District
Albanian communities in Serbia